Sáenz Peña was a Peruvian football club, located in the city of Callao. The club played in Primera Division Peruana from 1919 until 1921.

Honours

National
Peruvian Primera División: 0
Runner-up (1): 1919

See also
List of football clubs in Peru
Peruvian football league system

External links
 La difusión del fútbol en Lima (Spanish)
 RSSSF - Peru - List of Champions
 Peruvian football seasons

Football clubs in Lima